Mandira may refer to:

 a Sanskrit word meaning temple, and from which the Hindi/North Indian word mandir derives
 Mandira Bedi (born 1972), Indian actress
 Mandira Dam, a dam in Orissa state, India
 Mandira (instrument), consisting of a pair of metal bowls used for rhythm effect mainly used in India and Bangladesh
 Mandira (film), a 1990 Bengali film
 Mandıra, Sındırgı, village in Turkey